The 10th Parachute Division (10. Fallschirmjäger-Division) was an infantry division of the German military during the Second World War, active in 1945. It was "paratroop" in name only and fought as regular infantry.

The division was formed in March 1945, commanded by Gustav Wilke, out of a disparate collection of Luftwaffe units including existing parachute units in the Italian theatre, and crews from Jagdgeschwader 101. It contained the 28th, 29th and 30th Fallschirmjäger Regiments, and the 10th Fallschirmjäger Artillery Regiment.

The division fought in Austria and Moravia, surrendering to the Soviet Army in May 1945 at the end of the war.

Notes

References 

Fallschirmjäger divisions
Military units and formations established in 1945
Military units and formations disestablished in 1945